The 2010 IPP Open was a professional tennis tournament played on indoor carpet courts. It was the tenth edition of the tournament which was part of the 2010 ATP Challenger Tour. It took place in Helsinki, Finland between 22 and 28 November 2010.

ATP entrants

Seeds

 Rankings are as of November 15, 2010.

Other entrants
The following players received wildcards into the singles main draw:
  Marko Djokovic
  Antony Dupuis
  Henri Kontinen
  Micke Kontinen

The following players received a Special exempt into the singles main draw:
  Martin Kližan
  Alexander Kudryavtsev

The following players received entry from the qualifying draw:
  Ruben Bemelmans
  Mikhail Elgin
  Jan-Lennard Struff
  Jürgen Zopp

The following players received the lucky loser spots:
  Petru-Alexandru Luncanu
  Timo Nieminen

Champions

Singles

 Ričardas Berankis def.  Michał Przysiężny, 6–1, 2–0, RET.

Doubles

 Dustin Brown /  Martin Emmrich def.  Henri Kontinen /  Jarkko Nieminen, 7–6(17), 0–6, [10–7]

External links
Official website
ITF search 
2010 Draws

IPP Open
IPP Open